

References 

Post-nominal letters
Post-nominal letters
Italy